Sitthinan Rungrueang (born 20 July 2002) is a Thai professional footballer who plays as a forward for Thai League 2 club Suphanburi.

International goals

Thailand U16

Thailand U19

References

External links

2002 births
Living people
Sitthinan Rungrueang
Sitthinan Rungrueang
Association football forwards
Sitthinan Rungrueang
Sitthinan Rungrueang